Zoran Petković is a Bosnia-born tennis coach and former player who competed for Yugoslavia. He is an ethnic Serb.

Career
Petković won a doubles silver medal at the 1979 Mediterranean Games partnering with Zoltan Ilin. In the early 1980s he took part in two Davis Cup ties for Yugoslavia; he lost a dead rubber to former World No. 1 Romania's Ilie Năstase in straight sets in 1980.

Also in the early 1980s, he played college tennis for the South Carolina Gamecocks men's tennis.

Personal life
His older daughter is German tennis player Andrea Petkovic, whom he has coached in the past.

References

Living people
Sportspeople from Tuzla
Serbian male tennis players
Yugoslav male tennis players
Mediterranean Games silver medalists for Yugoslavia
Mediterranean Games medalists in tennis
Competitors at the 1979 Mediterranean Games
South Carolina Gamecocks men's tennis players
Year of birth missing (living people)
Serbs of Bosnia and Herzegovina